Elections to Metropolitan Borough of Bermondsey were held in 1953.

The borough had 13 wards which returned between three and five members. Of the 13 wards four of the wards had all candidates elected unopposed. Labour won all the seats, the Conservatives only stood in five wards, the Liberal Party in three wards and an independent in one ward.

Election result

|}

References

Council elections in the London Borough of Southwark
1953 in London
1953 English local elections
Bermondsey